Christopher Andrew Hayes (born December 23, 1973) is an American college baseball coach and former third baseman. He is the head baseball coach at Jacksonville University. Hayes played college baseball at Jacksonville for coach Terry Alexander from 1992 to 1995.

Amateur career
Hayes attended Englewood High School in Jacksonville, Florida. Hayes then enrolled at Jacksonville University, to play college baseball for the Jacksonville Dolphins baseball team.

As a freshman at Jacksonville in 1992, Hayes had a .303 batting average, a .362 on-base percentage (OBP) and a .423 SLG.

As a sophomore in 1993, Hayes batted .361 with a .549 SLG, 4 home run, and 37 RBIs.

In the 1994 season as a junior, Hayes hit .369 with a .552 SLG, 5 home run, and 49 RBIs. Hayes was drafted in the 35th round of the 1994 Major League Baseball draft by the Seattle Mariners, but Hayes opted to return to Jacksonville for his senior season.

Hayes had his best season as a senior in 1995, hitting a career high in doubles (12), home runs (7), RBIs (60) and slugged (.479).

Professional career
Hayes was drafted by the Toronto Blue Jays in the 28th round of the 1995 Major League Baseball draft. Hayes played 5 years in the Blue Jay's organization. Playing for the St. Catharines Blue Jays, Hagerstown Suns, Dunedin Blue Jays and Knoxville Smokies.

Coaching career
In 2001, Hayes joined the coaching staff at Wolfson High School in Jacksonville. In the fall of 2003, Hayes joined his alma mater, the Jacksonville Dolphins staff. In late 2008, Hayes was named the head coach at Seminole State College of Florida.

On June 24, 2016, Hayes was named the head coach of the Jacksonville program.

Head coaching record

See also
 List of current NCAA Division I baseball coaches

References

External links

Jacksonville Dolphins bio

Living people
1973 births
Baseball third basemen
Baseball outfielders
Jacksonville Dolphins baseball players
High school baseball coaches in the United States
Jacksonville Dolphins baseball coaches
Junior college baseball coaches in the United States
Dunedin Blue Jays players
Hagerstown Suns players
Knoxville Smokies players
St. Catharines Blue Jays players